Houses of Mercy were Anglican institutions that operated from the mid 19th century to the mid 20th.

They were to house "fallen women",  a term used to imply female sexual promiscuity or work in prostitution. Many women entering were unmarried mothers, an unacceptable situation at that time.

UK locations

England

Bristol
This home was in Ashley Road, Bedminster.

Stroud

The home was in the village of Bussage.

Chester

The home was in Lache lane.

Clewer

This home was at Clewer near Windsor in the county of Berkshire, England.

William Henry Hutchings was Warden from 1865 to 1884 when he became rector of Pickering. He was succeeded by Thomas Thellusson Carter.

Great Maplestead

This was known as the 'St Alban's House of Mercy'.

Horbury

This home, founded in 1859, was near Wakefield. The home celebrated its Golden jubilee in 1909.

Lostwithiel

While chaplain of Bodmin Jail, the Rev. W. F. Everest founded a Cornish home.

Newcastle upon Tyne

This was in Salters Road, Gosforth.

Wales

St Davids

The home was located in the village of Lamphey.

Overseas locations

South Africa

Cape Town
The home was located in Plein Street

Notable donors

As an Anglican charity, the homes attracted many notable sponsors, such as

Catherine Gladstone
She was the wife of four times Prime Minister, William Ewart Gladstone.

The Hon Pascoe Charles Glyn

He was a partner in the banking firm of Messrs Glyn, Mills, Currie & co.

Frances Selby Brodrick

She lived at Eaton Terrace, SW1.

Fanny Thursby

The widow of The Rev William Ford Thursby, Rector of Bergh Apton.

References

Imprisonment and detention
History of women in the United Kingdom
Anglicanism
Christianity and women